Dara Kass is an emergency medicine physician and Associate Professor of Emergency Medicine at Columbia University Medical Center. She is also an advocate for advancing the careers of women in medicine. While treating patients during the Coronavirus disease (COVID-19) pandemic, Kass became infected. Since then, she has become a prominent voice advocating for access to personal protective equipment and more effective measures to combat the spread of the disease.

Education and early career 
Kass was born and raised in Brooklyn, New York. Her mother was an emergency medicine nurse at Brookdale Hospital in Brooklyn and inspired Kass's career in medicine. She then attended the University of Maryland, College Park, where she received her Bachelor of Science degree in neurobiology and physiology in 1998. She then returned to Brooklyn to study medicine at SUNY Downstate Medical School, where she received her Doctor of Medicine degree in 2003. From 2003 to 2007, she performed her residency training in emergency medicine at SUNY Downstate Kings County Hospital.

Medical career 
Kass began her post-residency medical career as an attending physician at Staten Island University Hospital, where she remained for five years between 2007 and 2013 before moving to NYU Langone Medical Center. There, she ran the medical school programs in the emergency department, serving as the Director of Undergraduate Medical Education. In 2017, she became the Director of Equity and Inclusion and Associate Professor at Columbia University Irving Medical Center and in July 2018, she became an Assistant Attending Physician at New York Presbyterian Medical Center.

COVID-19 work 
While treating patients in New York City, Kass became infected with the novel coronavirus (SARS-CoV-2). When she first began treating coronavirus patients, she sent her children to live with her parents in New Jersey, while dividing up her home with her husband to prevent infecting her family. While she was in quarantine recovering from the disease, she continued to advocate for the growing urgency of the situation, noting emergency rooms overwhelmed with patients, shortages of ventilators and personal protective equipment for doctors, and the risks posed to healthcare workers inundated with COVID-19 cases. She has also discussed the risk the pandemic poses to healthcare workers' mental health as they will begin making decisions about whom to treat and whom to not treat in light of hospital supply shortages. As she began to recover, Kass began virtually consulting with patients using telemedicine technologies. During the COVID pandemic, she has appeared regularly as a medical expert on national cable news.

Kass has been critical of the Trump administration's response to the pandemic, citing inadequate attention paid to the forecasters' projections when they began warning of an emerging crisis in January and a continuing lack of federal oversight and coordination in response to the pandemic.

Advocacy 
Kass is an advocate for the advancement of women in medicine. She is a founding member of Time's Up Healthcare, working to root out sexual and gender harassment in medicine. She is also the founder and CEO of FemInEM, a blog and conference with a mission of promoting gender equity in emergency medicine since its inception in 2015. She has also written about the harassment that women in medicine experience even from their patients in the wake of reports that Les Moonves sexually harassed his physician. She also currently serves as the Director of Equity and Inclusion Initiatives at Columbia University Medical Center.

Leadership 
In addition to her work on promoting gender equity in medicine, Kass serves on the board of the nonprofit ORGANIZE, working to reform the organ donation system. She is also a board member of AFFIRM Research, an organization advocating for a public health approach to solving the epidemic of gun violence. She previously served on the board of directors for the Academy of Women in Academic Emergency Medicine between 2012 and 2015.

Awards and honors 

45under45, Emergency Medicine Residents' Association, 2019
Advancement of Women in Academic Emergency Medicine Award, Society for Academic Emergency Medicine, 2019
Advancing Emergency Care Award, NY American College of Emergency Physicians, 2019

Personal life 
Kass is a mother of three children. Her youngest son, Sammy, was diagnosed with a rare condition known as alpha-1 antitrypsin deficiency, which results in severely impaired liver function. While some infants outgrow the condition, her son did not. As a result,, she  chose to act as a living donor, donating a part of her liver to her son and recounted the experience in The New York Times. She has since advocated for revamping federal rules around U.S.'s organ donation system to increase access to organ donations.

References 

1970s births
American women physicians
American emergency physicians
Columbia University faculty
SUNY Downstate Medical Center alumni
University of Maryland, College Park alumni
Living people
American women academics
21st-century American women